Australians in China include Australian expatriates in China, international students, Chinese Australians as well as Chinese people of Australian descent. In 2001, there were over 55,000 Australians present in China. Out of them, over 2,000 lived in the capital Beijing; an estimated 3,900 in Guangzhou and about 2,500 in Shanghai. Notwithstanding mainland China, the remaining overwhelming 46,000 Australians resided in Hong Kong. By 2010, the number of Australians living in Mainland China had grown to 13,286, according to the Sixth National Population Census of the People's Republic of China.

Sport
Australian rules football in China has been revived by expat Australians.

Notable people
 David Gulasi - Social media personality in China
 Amy Lyons - Social media personality in China

See also

 Australians in Hong Kong
 Australian diaspora
 Chinese Australians
 Australian rules football in China

References

 
 
China
Ethnic groups in China